Raritan is a village in Henderson County, Illinois, United States. The population was 138 at the 2010 census. It is part of the Burlington, IA–IL Micropolitan Statistical Area.

Geography
Raritan is located in southeastern Henderson County at  (40.696535, -90.826079).

Demographics

As of the census of 2000, there were 140 people, 59 households, and 44 families residing in the village. The racial makeup of the village was 99.29% White, and 0.71% from two or more races.

There were 59 households, out of which 35.6% had children under the age of 18 living with them, 64.4% were married couples living together, 6.8% had a female householder with no husband present, and 25.4% were non-families. 25.4% of all households were made up of individuals, and 13.6% had someone living alone who was 65 years of age or older. The average household size was 2.37 and the average family size was 2.82.

In the village, the population was spread out, with 23.6% under the age of 18, 6.4% from 18 to 24, 27.9% from 25 to 44, 23.6% from 45 to 64, and 18.6% who were 65 years of age or older. The median age was 41 years. For every 100 females, there were 102.9 males. For every 100 females age 18 and over, there were 91.1 males.

The median income for a household in the village was $27,917, and the median income for a family was $30,313. Males had a median income of $21,563 versus $18,750 for females. The per capita income for the village was $14,484. None of the population and none of the families were below the poverty line.

Founding of the village 

Raritan was founded by settlers of Dutch Reformed Church who originated from Raritan, New Jersey.

“ In the southeast corner of Henderson county, the village of Raritan began in 1856 when a group of immigrants of the Dutch Reformed denomination from New Jersey came to what was then called Bedford Precinct. Since many of the settlers came from New Jersey towns located along the Raritan River, it was only natural for them to name their new community after the land they left behind.”
http://www.hendersoncountyedc.com/Communities/Raritan

Tornado outbreak of 1995 

Raritan was hit with an F1 tornado in May, 1995.

References

Villages in Henderson County, Illinois
Villages in Illinois
Burlington, Iowa micropolitan area
Dutch-American culture in Illinois
1856 establishments in Illinois